The 2019 Boca Raton Bowl was a college football bowl game that was played on December 21, 2019, with kickoff at 3:30 p.m. EST on ABC. It was the 6th edition of the Boca Raton Bowl, and was one of the 2019–20 bowl games concluding the 2019 FBS football season. Sponsored by the Cheribundi beverage company, the game was officially known as the Cheribundi Boca Raton Bowl.

Teams
This was the first time that Florida Atlantic and SMU had ever played each other.

SMU Mustangs

SMU finished their regular season with a 10–2 record (6–2 in conference). The Mustangs finished in third place in the West Division of the American Athletic Conference.

Florida Atlantic Owls

Florida Atlantic finished their regular season atop the East Division of Conference USA (C-USA), then defeated UAB in the C-USA Championship Game, 49–6. The Owls entered the bowl with a 10–3 record (7–1 in conference).

Game summary

Statistics

References

External links
 Game statistics at statbroadcast.com

Boca Raton Bowl
Boca Raton Bowl
Florida Atlantic Owls football bowl games
SMU Mustangs football bowl games
Boca Raton Bowl
Boca Raton Bowl